137th may refer to:

137th (Calgary) Battalion, CEF, unit in the Canadian Expeditionary Force during the First World War
137th Air Reconnaissance Regiment, air reconnaissance and guidance regiment, part of the SFR Yugoslav Air Force
137th Special Operations Wing (137 SOW), Oklahoma Air National Guard wing operationally-gained by the Special Operations Command (AFSOC)
137th Airlift Squadron flies the C-5 Galaxy and the C-17A Globemaster III
137th Armoured Brigade (United Kingdom), British Army unit during the Second World War
137th Delaware General Assembly, meeting of the legislative branch of the Delaware state government
137th Field Artillery Battalion (United States), Field Artillery battalion of the Army National Guard
137th Georgia General Assembly succeeded the 136th and served as the precedent for the 138th General Assembly in 1985
137th Illinois Volunteer Infantry Regiment, infantry regiment that served in the Union Army during the American Civil War
137th meridian east, line of longitude across the Arctic Ocean, Asia, the Pacific Ocean, Australasia, the Indian Ocean, the Southern Ocean and Antarctica
137th meridian west, line of longitude across the Arctic Ocean, North America, the Pacific Ocean, the Southern Ocean and Antarctica
137th Ohio Infantry (or 137th OVI), infantry regiment in the Union Army during the American Civil War
137th Operations Group, Flying element of the 137th Air Refueling Wing of the Oklahoma Air National Guard
137th Space Warning Squadron (137 SWS), Air National Guard ground-mobile space communications unit of the United States Air Force in Greeley, Colorado
137th Street (Manhattan), New York
137th Street (Metra) or Riverdale (Metra), one of two commuter rail stations on the Metra Electric main branch in Riverdale, Illinois
137th Street – City College (IRT Broadway – Seventh Avenue Line), local station on the New York City Subway
137th Street Yard serves the IRT Flushing Line (7 <7> trains)
Pennsylvania's 137th Representative District or Pennsylvania House of Representatives, District 137

See also
137 (number)
AD 137, the year 137 (CXXXVII) of the Julian calendar
137 BC